Bob Welch may refer to:

Bob Welch (baseball) (1956–2014), American baseball pitcher
Bob Welch (author) (born c. 1955), American author and newspaper columnist
Bob Welch (musician) (1945–2012), American musician and member of Fleetwood Mac
Bob Welch (album)
Bob Welch (politician) (1928–2000), Canadian politician

See also
Robert Welch (disambiguation)